Highway 443, or Route 443 may refer to the following roads.

Canada
Manitoba Provincial Road 443

Germany
Bundesautobahn 443

Israel
 Route 443 (Israel)

Japan
 Japan National Route 443

United States
  Indiana State Road 443
  Louisiana Highway 443
  Maryland Route 443 (former)
  Nevada State Route 443
  New York State Route 443
  Pennsylvania Route 443
  Puerto Rico Highway 443